Máel Cobo mac Fiachnai (died 647) was a Dal Fiatach king of Ulaid. He was the son of Fiachnae mac Demmáin (died 627) and half-brother of Dúnchad mac Fiachnai (died c. 644), previous kings. He ruled from c. 644 to 647.

The Dal Fiatach recovered the overlordship of Ulaid after the death of Congal Cáech at the Battle of Mag Roth in 637 and were to retain it until 674. Family strife was a common theme among the dynasty at this time. Máel Cobo was himself killed or slain by his nephew Congal Cennfota mac Dúnchada (died 674) in 647.

His sons were Blathmac mac Máele Cobo (died 670), a king of Ulaid and Óengus whose grandson Cathal mac Muiredaig was ancestor of the Leth Cathail sept of the Dal Fiatach.

Notes

See also
Kings of Ulster

References

 Byrne, Francis John (2001), Irish Kings and High-Kings, Dublin: Four Courts Press, 
 Charles-Edwards, T. M. (2000), Early Christian Ireland, Cambridge: Cambridge University Press,  
 Gearoid Mac Niocaill (1972), Ireland before the Vikings, Dublin: Gill and Macmillan

External links
CELT: Corpus of Electronic Texts at University College Cork

Kings of Ulster
647 deaths
7th-century Irish monarchs
People from County Antrim
Year of birth unknown